Manny Mashouf (born 6 July 1938) is an Iranian-American businessman and philanthropist known for founding Bebe Stores.

Early life and education
Born in 1938 in Pahlavi Iran, he came to the United States in his teens and settled first in Washington D.C., then in San Francisco. He attended San Francisco State University (SFSU) and graduated in 1966 with a political science degree.

Career
He first managed a steakhouse in the early 1970's, before founding his own fashion line in 1976.

He was the manager and chairman of Bebe stores and in 1998, he took the company public. In 2006 Mashouf was worth $1.5 billion USD - resulting in Forbes listing him as the 242nd richest American. By 2007 that has dropped to $1.3 billion USD.

Manny Mashouf partnered with Giovanni Agnelli and Scott Bloom, they founded the production company Argonaut Pictures in 2007.

It was announced in 2015 that he was to sell his 59% stake in Bebe Stores. All of Bebe's stores were scheduled to close and liquidate inventory by the end of May 2017.

Philanthropy
In 2005 Mashouf pledged $10 million to his alma mater, San Francisco State University for a performing arts center. The donation was later redirected to the construction of the Mashouf Wellness Center.

Personal life
In 1984, he married Neda Mashouf (née Nobari, or Shafigh-Noubari), who later worked as the former vice chairman and manager of merchandise at Bebe. In 2006, the couple filed for divorce, and Neda resigned from her position at Bebe. Together they had two children, Daria Mashouf and Iman Mashouf.

In 2017, Mashouf sold his home in Bel–Air in Los Angeles for $30 million USD.

See also
List of California State University, Fresno people
List of San Francisco State University people
List of fashion designers

References

External links
Manny Mashouf at Forbes.com

Iranian emigrants to the United States
American fashion businesspeople
Iranian businesspeople
Iranian fashion designers
American billionaires
Iranian billionaires
Living people
People from Tehran
San Francisco State University alumni
1938 births